Belinda Schmid (born 31 January 1981) is a Swiss former synchronized swimmer who competed in the 2000 and 2004 Summer Olympics.

References

1981 births
Living people
Swiss synchronized swimmers
Olympic synchronized swimmers of Switzerland
Synchronized swimmers at the 2000 Summer Olympics
Synchronized swimmers at the 2004 Summer Olympics